Daviesia villifera is a species of flowering plant in the family Fabaceae and is endemic to eastern Australia. It is a hairy shrub with arching branches, sharply-pointed egg-shaped to heart-shaped phyllodes, and yellow and dark red flowers.

Description

Taxonomy and naming
Daviesia villifera was first formally described in 1837 by George Bentham from an unpublished description by Allan Cunningham. Bentham's description was published in his Commentationes de Leguminosarum Generibus. The specific epithet (villifera) means "bearing woolly or shaggy hair".

Distribution and habitat
This bitter-pea usually in forest between Carnarvon National Park to Brisbane in Queensland, and near Grafton in northern New South Wales.

References

villifera
Flora of New South Wales
Flora of Queensland
Plants described in 1837
Taxa named by George Bentham